Allain Provost is a French landscape architect. His works include designs for the Parc Floral in the Bois de Vincennes, Paris, Parc André Citroën in Paris, the Jardin Diderot at La Défense, La Courneuve Park (1972–2000) in Seine-Saint-Denis, Ile-de-France, the Eurotunnel in Calais (1987), the Technocentre Renault, Guyancourt (1992–2000), the reconstruction of the castle gardens of Villarceaux (1994–1999), and the Thames Barrier Park, London (1995–2000), constructed in conjunction with London architectural firm Patel Taylor. He was a jury member on the Father Collins Park design competition in Dublin in 2003. He established the Groupe Signe in 1990 with another landscape architect Alain Cousseran.

References

French landscape architects
Living people
Year of birth missing (living people)